Windsor Junction can refer to:
Windsor Junction, Nova Scotia
Windsor Junction, a station on the Ngapara Branch railway line in New Zealand